CBS 32 may refer to one of the following television stations in the United States:

Current
KTAB-TV in Abilene, Texas
WLKY in Louisville, Kentucky

Former
WNEG-TV (now WGTA) in Toccoa, Georgia (1995 to 2008)
W22FA-D in Mayaguez, Puerto Rico (2019 to 2020)
Was a translator of WSEE-TV in Erie, Pennsylvania